WMLV (89.7 FM), branded as "K-Love", is a contemporary Christian-formatted radio station in Miami, Florida, owned by Educational Media Foundation. This listener supported, nonprofit public radio station had been owned by American Public Media Group, the parent nonprofit support organization of Minnesota Public Radio. The station was operated by Classical South Florida, a Florida nonprofit corporation owned by the American Public Media Group. The station's primary transmitter is located at 17107 SW 248 Street, 4.5 miles north of downtown Homestead.

Most of WKCP's former classical programming was provided by American Public Media's Classical 24 service. The station's schedule also included Performance Today, SymphonyCast, Pipedreams, and Saint Paul Sunday.

WMLV's programming is simulcast on WFLV 90.7 (formerly WPBI) in West Palm Beach and WDLV in Fort Myers. WKCP originally used translator station W270AD at 101.9 FM, until that station adopted National Public Radio programming shortly after APM purchased WPBI from Barry Communications in May 2011. WFLV's main signal still runs NPR news briefs at the top of drive time hours, and its HD2 subchannel also carries NPR programming, which is simulcasted on W270AD.

Lawsuit by former listeners
89.7 FM was formerly WMCU, a Christian radio station owned by Trinity University.

On October 19, 2007, the Christian Family Coalition spearheaded a lawsuit brought by two local residents, who filed suit against American Public Media and Trinity University and its officers, seeking an injunction and $15,000 in damages for the plaintiffs and an injunction to block the sale of WMCU and format change. The station signed back on a week prior to what was originally planned, partly in an effort to thwart any potential legal action prior to Federal Communications Commission approval of the sale.

The FCC did eventually approve the sale, in March 2008, upheld following an Application for Review to the full FCC, and while the parties involved in the campaign to try to regain the frequency continued on for several years with the state, the station has not been affected by those other matters as the issues raised by those parties concerned the seller only.

Sale to EMF and format change to K-Love
On July 17, 2015, WKCP and the two other Classical South Florida stations were sold to Educational Media Foundation and switched to EMF's K-Love contemporary Christian format under new call letters, WMLV. In consequence, Christian programming resumed at 89.7 FM for the first time since 2008. EMF's purchase of WMLV, along with co-owned WDLV, WFLV, W214BD, and W270AD, was consummated on November 2, 2015, at a price of $21.7 million.

Previous logo

References

External links
"Tuning in to WKCP" Palm Beach Post October 27, 2007

MLV
K-Love radio stations
Educational Media Foundation radio stations
1970 establishments in Florida
Radio stations established in 1970
MLV